The "monster of Aramberri" is the name that was given to the fossil remains of a huge marine reptile, a giant carnivore belonging to the Pliosauroidea clade that was found in sediments of the La Caja Formation in Aramberri, Nuevo León, Mexico by a student of the Facultad de Ciencias de la Tierra of the Universidad Autónoma de Nuevo León while conducting geological mapping in 1985.

Size and ontogenetic stage 

It was initially falsely identified as Liopleurodon ferox. French and German paleontologists classified it as a giant pliosaur, which lived around 140 million years ago in shallow waters of the area, in what is now Aramberri, Mexico.

The specimen is not properly named and described yet though the first assumptions of it being a juvenile individual have been outdated and that it is apparently not related to Liopleurodon ferox.

History 
The director of excavation was José Guadalupe López-Oliva from the Facultad de Ciencias de la Tierra de la UANL. Other specialists involved were Wolfgang Stinnesbeck from the Faculty of Geosciences of Karlsruhe Institute of Technology, and Eberhard Frey and Marie-Céline Buchy of the State Museum of Natural History Karlsruhe, Germany.

In 2001, the site was evaluated and dispersed remains were recovered. The stratum which contains pliosaur remains was identified. In 2002, a specific excavation began, supported by local people, to cleanse the sediment which contains bone remains of different sizes. Some remains were sent to the Museum of Natural History of Karlsruhe.

On January 3, 2003, remains of the Monster of Aramberri arrived in Karlsruhe, boxed in 14 huge containers. The Museum of Natural History of the city of Karlsruhe was the place assigned for its reconstruction. The bones would be prepared by the specialists of the Museum in order to copy them. Copies would stay at the Museum, while originals would return to Mexico.

As the Museum of Natural History of Karlsruhe could not accept any more remains because it was at its maximum capacity, new remains were sent to the Museo del Desierto in Saltillo, Coahuila, also in Mexico, where the specialist in marine reptiles, Dra. Marie Buchy, is still studying them. Nowadays, part of the fossil is on display at Museo de Historia Mexicana, in a temporary exposition called "Fósiles Marinos de Nuevo Léon, antes mar, ahora montañas".

In November 2012, after 27 years from its discovery spent on expositions and research, the "Monster of Aramberri" remains were transferred to Facultad de Ciencias de la Tierra from UANL located at Linares, Nuevo León, México.

References 

Plesiosaurs
Jurassic fossil record
Undescribed vertebrate species